Hitler's Children may refer to:

 Hitler's Children: The Story of the Baader-Meinhof Terrorist Gang, a 1977 book about a West German militant group
 Hitler's Children (1943 film), an American black-and-white propaganda film
 Hitler's Children (2011 film), an Israeli-German documentary film